Forever, for Always, for Luther, released on July 27, 2004 by GRP Records, is a smooth jazz various artists tribute album, with ten popular songs written by Luther Vandross. The album featured vocal arrangements by Luther, and was produced by Rex Rideout and Bud Harner.

Rideout had co-authored songs and contributed arrangements and played keyboards on Luther's final three albums. The tribute album was mixed by Ray Bardani, who recorded and mixed most of Luther's music over the years.

It featured an ensemble of jazz performers, many of whom had previously worked with Luther. The artists on the album were:

 Lalah Hathaway(4), Lisa Fischer(8), Brenda White(8), Cindy Mizelle(8), Fonzi Thornton(8), Ledisi(7) – vocals
 Rex Rideout(1-5,7-10), Brian Culbertson(6) – keyboards
 Sundra Manning(2,4) – Hammond organ
 George Benson(9), Ray Fuller(4), Paul Jackson Jr.(1-3,6,7), John Pondel(9), Dwight Sills(8,10), Ty Stevens(5) – guitar
 Alex Al(3,7,8) – acoustic and electric bass
 Sekou Bunch(1,2,4) – acoustic bass
 Steve Ferrone(5,10), Michael White(1,2,4) – drums
 Lenny Castro(1,2,4,6,10) – percussion
 Mindi Abair(5), Dave Koz(6) – alto saxophone
 Richard Elliot(8), Boney James(3,7), Kirk Whalum(1) – tenor saxophone
 Brandon Fields(4,5) – saxophone
 Lee Thornburg(4,5,9) – trumpet
 Rick Braun(10) – trumpet
 Nick Lane(4,5,9) – trombone

Several songs from the album received airplay on jazz and R&B stations, but Hathaway's cover of "Forever, for Always, for Love" was the biggest success, becoming a #1 Adult R&B hit, reaching the Top 40 on the main R&B chart, and even approaching the Hot 100 (it "bubbled under" at #112).

On November 21, 2006, saxophonist Dave Koz released a follow-up to the earlier GRP tribute album, this time a Luther tribute album by various artists on his own Rendezvous Entertainment label, called Forever, for Always, for Luther Volume II, also produced by Rex Rideout and Bud Harner. Dave Koz played on all the follow-up album's tracks, which were recorded by smooth jazz artists Patti Austin, Gerald Albright, Jonathan Butler, Norman Brown, Will Downing, Everette Harp, Jeff Lorber, Maysa, Najee, Wayman Tisdale, Kevin Whalum and Kirk Whalum.

Track listing

 "Any Love"
 "Never Too Much"
 "Wait for Love"
 "Forever, for Always, for Love"
 "Stop to Love"
 "If Only for One Night"
 "My Sensitivity (Gets in the Way)"
 "Your Secret Love"
 "Take You Out"
 "Dance with My Father”

References

Luther Vandross tribute albums
2004 compilation albums
Smooth jazz compilation albums
GRP Records compilation albums